Monte is a given name and surname. Notable people with the name include:

Given name or nickname
 Monte Attell (1885–1960), American world champion bantamweight boxer
 Monte Collins (1898–1951), American actor and screenwriter
 Monte Cook (born 1968), American game designer and writer, best known for his work on Dungeons & Dragons
 Monte Hellman (1932–2021), American film director, producer, writer and editor
 Monte Irvin (1919–2016), Negro league and Major League Baseball player, member of the Baseball Hall of Fame
 Monte M. Katterjohn (1891–1949), American screenwriter
 Monte Ledbetter (1943–2020), American football player
 Monte Markham (born 1935), American actor
 Monte Melkonian (1957–1993), Armenian militant, revolutionary and military commander
 Monte Merkel (1916–1981), American football player
 Monte Money (born 1986), American guitarist and vocalist, former lead guitarist of the American post-hardcore band Escape the Fate
 Monte Montgomery (born 1966), American guitarist and singer-songwriter
 Monte Morris (born 1995), American college basketball player
 Monte Pittman (born 1975), American musician known largely as Madonna's long-time guitarist
 Monté Ross (born 1970), American college basketball head coach
 Monte Scheinblum (born 1967), American golfer, 1992 US & World Long Drive Champion
 Monte Solberg (born 1958), Canadian politician
 Monte Waterbury (1876–1920), American businessman and polo player

Surname
 Herkus Monte (died 1273), a leader of the Great Prussian Uprising against the Teutonic Knights and Northern Crusaders
 José Luis Alvarez del Monte, Uruguayan chess master
 Lou Monte (1917–1989), Italian-American singer
 Nélson Monte (born 1995), Portuguese footballer
 Philippe de Monte (1521–1603), Renaissance composer 
 Pierre de Monte (1499–1572), Italian Grandmaster of the Order of Saint John

See also
Monti (given name)
Monti (surname)
Montie, given name and surname
Monty, given name and surname